Léon Metchnikoff (30 May 1838 – 30 June 1888) was an anarchist geographer. Born in Saint Petersburg, Russia on May 30, 1838, he fought in Garibaldi's army and met Mikhail Bakunin in 1864. Metchnikoff lived in Geneva for ten years and Japan for two. Upon his return, he lectured on Japan and collaborated with Elisée Reclus on the New Universal Geography. Metchnikoff taught statistics and comparative geography at the Academy of Neuchâtel from 1883 to 1887, when he grew ill. 

He died in Clarens, Switzerland, on June 30, 1888. Léon was the elder brother of the Nobel Prize laureate Élie Metchnikoff.

Works 

 The Japanese Empire (1881)
 Civilization and the Great Historical Rivers (1889)

References

Further reading

External links 

1838 births
1888 deaths
Scientists from Saint Petersburg
People from Geneva
Russian anarchists
Russian geographers
Russian Japanologists
Russian people of Romanian descent
Russian Jews
Academic staff of the University of Neuchâtel